This list of IIM Bangalore alumni includes notable people who are alumni of Indian Institute of Management Bangalore.

Academics
 Aswath Damodaran (PGP 1979), Kerschner Family Chairperson in Finance Education & Professor of Finance, Stern School of Business, New York University
 Sangeet Paul Choudary (PGP 2006), business scholar and author of the books Platform Revolution and Platform Scale. Youngest ever recipient of the IIMB Distinguished Alumnus Award (DAA) at the age of 37.
 Gopal Krishna Nayak (PGP 1988), Former Director IIIT Bhubaneswar
 Raghavendra Rau, Sir Evelyn de Rothschild Professor of Finance, Judge Business School, University of Cambridge
 Das Nayarandas, Edsel Bryant Ford Professor of Business Administration and Senior Associate Dean for HBS Publishing & External Relations at Harvard Business School

Arts and literature
 Karan Bajaj (PGP 2002), American author
 Nila Madhab Panda, film maker and director
 Ravi Subramanian (PGP 1993), author

Business
 Sonjoy Chatterjee (PGP 1994), Chairman & Co-CEO, Goldman Sachs India
 Sameer Suneja (PGP 1994), Global CEO, Perfetti Van Melle
 Puneet Dalmia (PGP 1997), MD, Dalmia Bharat Group
 Damodar Mall (PGP 1986), CEO, Reliance Retail
 Deeptha Khanna (PGP 1998), Executive Vice President and Chief Business Leader, Philips
 Dinesh Khanna (PGP 1998), Global People Chair, BCG
 Saugata Gupta (PGP 1991), MD & CEO, Marico
 Bhargav Dasgupta (PGP 1992), MD & CEO, ICICI Lombard
 Dinanath Dubhashi (PGP 1990), MD & CEO, L&T Finance Holdings (Larsen & Toubro group company)
 R Chandrasekaran (PGP 1985), Executive Vice Chairman, Cognizant India
 Rajeev Bakshi (PGP 1979), former MD Metro Cash & Carry India, former Chairman PepsiCo India, former Joint MD ICICI Ventures
 R Venkataraman, Co-Promoter & MD, IIFL (India Infoline)
 Hitesh Oberoi (PGP 1996), Co-Promoter MD & CEO, Info Edge (Naukri.com)
 Ashok Sinha (PGP 1977), former Chairman & MD, BPCL
 D Rajkumar (PGP 1984), Chairman & MD, BPCL
 Arun Balakrishnan (PGP 1976), former Chairman & MD, HPCL
 Rajiv Maliwal (PGP 1985), Founder & Managing Partner, Sabre Partners
 Prashant Jain (PGP 1992), Chief Investment Officer, HDFC Asset Management
 Manish Gunwani, Chief Investment Officer - Equity, Nippon India Asset Management
 Samir Kumar (PGP 1986), General Partner, Inventus Capital India
 Parag Dhol (PGP 1993), General Partner, Inventus Capital India
 Rajiv Sawhney (PGP 1981), former CEO, Mahindra Holidays (Mahindra Group)
 Deepak Ohri, CEO, Lebua Hotels & Resorts
 Malavika Harita (PGP 1982), CEO, Saatchi & Saatchi Focus
 Shashi Sinha (PGP 1981), CEO, IPG India
 Vinod Tahiliani, CEO, India Gas Solutions - JV between Reliance Industries & BP
 Sahil Barua (PGP 2008), Co-Founder & CEO, Delhivery
 Satya Narayanan R. (PGP 1995), Founder, Career Launcher
 PC Musthafa (PGPEM 2007), Founder, CEO,  ID Fresh Foods
 Rajiv Srivatsa (PGP 2004), Founder and COO Urban Ladder the online furniture sales company.
 Ashish Goel (PGP 2004), Founder and CEO Urban Ladder the online furniture sales company.
 Apurva Purohit (PGP 1989), President Jagran Prakashan Limited, Businesswoman and Author.
 Lokvir Kapoor, Founder and Executive Chairman, Pine Labs

Public service
 K. Radhakrishnan (PGP 1976), former Chairman of ISRO
 Hasmukh Adhia (PGPPM 2002), IAS, Revenue Secretary of India.
 Ravi Neelakantan (PGP 1982), IFS, Diplomat

References

External links 
 

	 

Indian Institutes of Management alumni
Alumni
IIM Bangalore
IIM Bangalore